Non-cellular life, or acellular life is life that exists without a cellular structure for at least part of its life cycle. Historically, most (descriptive) definitions of life postulated that an organism must be composed of one or more cells, but this is no longer considered necessary, and modern criteria allow for forms of life based on other structural arrangements.

The primary candidates for non-cellular life are viruses. Some biologists consider viruses to be organisms, but others do not. Their primary objection is that no known viruses are capable of autonomous reproduction: they must rely on cells to copy them.

Engineers sometimes use the term "artificial life" to refer to software and robots inspired by biological processes, but these do not satisfy any biological definition of life.

Viruses as non-cellular life 

The nature of viruses was unclear for many years following their discovery as pathogens. They were described as poisons or toxins at first, then as "infectious proteins", but with advances in microbiology it became clear that they also possessed genetic material, a defined structure, and the ability to spontaneously assemble from their constituent parts. This spurred extensive debate as to whether they should be regarded as fundamentally organic or inorganic — as very small biological organisms or very large biochemical molecules — and since the 1950s many scientists have thought of viruses as existing at the border between chemistry and life; a gray area between living and nonliving.

Viral replication and self-assembly has implications for the study of the origin of life, as it lends further credence to the hypotheses that cells and viruses could have started as a pool of replicators where selfish genetic information was parasitizing on producers in RNA world, as two strategies to survive, gained in response to environmental conditions, or as self-assembling organic molecules.

Viroids 

Viroids are the smallest infectious pathogens known to biologists, consisting solely of short strands of circular, single-stranded RNA without protein coats. They are mostly plant pathogens and some are animal pathogens, from which some are of commercial importance. Viroid genomes are extremely small in size, ranging from 246 to 467 nucleobases. In comparison, the genome of the smallest known viruses capable of causing an infection by themselves are around 2,000 nucleobases in size. Viroids are the first known representatives of a new biological realm of sub-viral pathogens.

Viroid RNA does not code for any protein. Its replication mechanism hijacks RNA polymerase II, a host cell enzyme normally associated with synthesis of messenger RNA from DNA, which instead catalyzes "rolling circle" synthesis of new RNA using the viroid's RNA as a template. Some viroids are ribozymes, having catalytic properties which allow self-cleavage and ligation of unit-size genomes from larger replication intermediates.

Viroids attained significance beyond plant virology since one possible explanation of their origin is that they represent "living relics" from a hypothetical, ancient, and non-cellular RNA world before the evolution of DNA or protein. This view was first proposed in the 1980s, and regained popularity in the 2010s to explain crucial intermediate steps in the evolution of life from inanimate matter (Abiogenesis).

Taxonomy 
In discussing the taxonomic domains of life, the terms "Acytota" and "Aphanobionta" are occasionally used as the name of a viral kingdom, domain, or empire. The corresponding cellular life name would be Cytota. Non-cellular organisms and cellular life would be the two top-level subdivisions of life, whereby life as a whole would be known as organisms, Naturae, Biota or Vitae. The taxon Cytota would include three top-level subdivisions of its own, the domains Bacteria, Archaea, and Eukarya.

See also 

 Carbon chauvinism
 Hypothetical types of biochemistry
 Nanobe
 Plasmid
 Protocell
 Subviral agent
 Defective interfering particle
 Prion, an infectious protein
 Satellite, a subviral agent requiring coinfection
 Viral evolution

References 

Biological classification
Life
Virology
Viruses